Bishop Peter Štumpf, S.D.B. (born 28 June 1962) is a Slovenian Roman Catholic prelate who serves as the second Bishop of the Diocese of Murska Sobota since 28 November 2009. Previously he was a Titular Bishop of Musti in Numidia and Auxiliary Bishop of the Archdiocese of Maribor from 24 May 2006 until 28 November 2009.

Education
Bishop Štumpf was born into a Roman Catholic family in Murska Sobota, but grew up in Beltinci in the Prekmurje region, where his parents came from.

After finishing primary school in 1977, which he attended in Beltinci and a secondary school in Želimlje, he graduated at the classical gymnasium Poljane in Ljubljana in 1983, while joined a religious congregation of the Salesians of Don Bosco and after the novitiate made a profession on August 9, 1980. After he completed his compulsory military service in the Yugoslav Army in 1983, Peter consequently studied at the Theological faculty at the University of Ljubljana from 1984 and continued his studies at the Salesian Pontifical University in Turin, Italy from 1986 and was ordained as priest on June 29, 1990 by Bishop Franc Kramberger in Maribor, after completed his philosophical and theological studies in 1989.

Pastoral work
After his ordination Fr. Štumpf was appointed as chaplain in the parish of Rakovnik in Ljubljana, where he worked until 1993, when he went to work as a chaplain in the parish of Sevnica for two years. A year later, he was appointed pastor of Ig, where he worked until 1998, and then for a year he was the parish administrator of the parish of Zabukovje nad Sevnico, and after in Maribor. There was the pastor of the parish of St. Giovanni Bosco, and in 2000 he was appointed pastor in Veržej. Since 2003 he has been the pastor of the parish of Mary Help in Rakovnik in Ljubljana. Also he served as a Dean of the deanery of Ljubljana-Vič and Rakovnik.

During this time of the pastoral work, he continued his studies at the Theological faculty of the University of Ljubljana with the master's degree in the Moral Theology in 1994 and the Doctor of Theology degree in 2002.

Prelate
On May 24, 2006, he was appointed by Pope Benedict XVI as the a Titular Bishop of Musti in Numidia and Auxiliary Bishop of Archdiocese of Maribor. On September 10, 2006, he was consecrated as bishop by Metropolitan Archbishop Franc Kramberger and other prelates of the Roman Catholic Church in the Cathedral of Saint John the Baptist in Maribor.

On November 28, 2009 Bishop Štumpf was transferred to the vacant Diocese of Murska Sobota and installed as its second bishop on January 10, 2010.

References

1962 births
Living people
People from Murska Sobota
Salesian bishops
University of Ljubljana alumni
Salesian Pontifical University alumni
21st-century Roman Catholic bishops in Slovenia
Bishops appointed by Pope Benedict XVI